Journey of Love may refer to:

Journey of Love (1994 TV series), with Marco Ngai
The Journey of Love, 2008 album by Shireen and Zaskia Sungkar
"The Journey of Love", 2009 hit single by Na Ying
The Journey of Love, 2011 album by 7icons